The Austrian Traded Index (ATX) is the most important stock market index of the Wiener Börse. The ATX is, like most European indices, defined as a price index and currently consists of 20 stocks.

Annual Returns 

The following table shows the annual development of the Austrian Traded Index since 1985.

Components
As of March 2021, the index includes the following companies.

Companies Removed
Since 2011, the following companies have been removed from the ATX:

Vienna International Airport
Strabag
Bwin
Intercell
Semperit
AMAG Austria Metall
Telekom Austria
FACC

Performance and year-end values 
The ATX closed the year of 2018 at 2.745,78.

In 2015, the Austrian Traded Index closed at 2.396,94 (Dec 30, 2015). The previous years' closing values were 2.401,21 (2012), 2.546,54 (2013), and 2.160,08 (2014).

References

External links 
 Bloomberg page for ATX:IND
 Vienna Stock Exchange ATX Overview
 Yahoo ATX Overview
 Homepage of Wiener Börse with ATX
https://www.wienerborse.at/news/wiener-boerse-news/news/wiener-boerse-erweitert-bestehendes-atx-angebot-um-neue-short-und-leverage-indizes/
https://www.wienerborse.at/news/wiener-boerse-news/news/wiener-boerse-startet-benchmark-fuer-familienunternehmen/

Austrian stock market indices